Leontios was Bishop of Neapolis (Limassol) in Cyprus in the 7th century. He wrote a Life of John the Merciful, commissioned by the archbishop of Constantia Arcadius; a Life of Simeon the Holy Fool; a lost Life of Spyridon, an apologia against the Jews and another apologia in defence of icons. His apologia in defence of the icons was read by the bishop of Constantia, Constantine II at the Second Council of Nicaea that focused on the Byzantine Iconoclasm. His works are considered among the few works giving any insight into the vernacular Greek of Early and Middle Byzantium. He was probably present at the Lateran council in Rome in 649. His work was translated in Latin and published in Patrologia Graeca.

Publications 

 Leontii Neapoleos in Cipro Episcopi. Opera Omnia (1865) Greek original with parallel Latin translation.
 Leontios’ von Neapolis: Leben des helligen Johannes des Barmherzigen (1893) German Translation.

References

External links
 Derek Krueger: Symeon the Holy Fool: Leontius' Life and the Late Antique City, Berkeley:  University of California Press 1996.
 Jan Hofstra: Leontius von Neapolis und Symeon der heilige Narr, ein Pastor als Hagiograph, Diss. Groningen 2008, 

Year of birth missing
Year of death missing
7th-century Byzantine bishops
7th-century Byzantine writers
Byzantine writers
Christian writers
Cypriot biographers
Bishops of the Church of Cyprus
People from Limassol